Eoherpeton is the only genus of the family Eoherpetontidae in the extinct suborder Embolomeri. It is known from the Visean and Namurian (now Serpukhovian and lower Bashkirian) stages of the Carboniferous of Scotland.

References

External links
The skull of Eoherpeton, from the original description
A 3D reconstruction of the skull, using microCT scans, published by Liz Martin-Silverstone's twitter account

Embolomeres
Carboniferous tetrapods of Europe
Fossil taxa described in 1975